The Lily of Poverty Flat  was a book by Bret Harte adapted into the 1915 film of the same name. The plot features a fictional Northern California mining town called Poverty Flat. The movie version was filmed near Santa Cruz, California. Described as a genteel Western, the film reportedly met with meagre box office results. It was directed by George E. Middleton.

See also
Salomy Jane (1914 film)

References

1915 films